This is a list of amphibians and reptiles found on Grenada, an island in the Caribbean Lesser Antilles.

Amphibians
There are four species of amphibian on Grenada, one of which was introduced.  One species, Eleutherodactylus euphronides, is endemic to Grenada.

Frogs (Anura)

Reptiles
Including marine turtles and introduced species, there are 20 reptile species reported on Grenada, though the status of four species is uncertain.

Turtles (Testudines)

Lizards and snakes (Squamata)

See also
List of amphibians and reptiles of the Grenadines

Notes

References
Note: All species listed above are supported by Malhotra & Thorpe 1999, unless otherwise cited.

.

 Amphibians
Amphibians
Grenada
 Grenada
 Grenada
Grenada
Grenada
Grenada